The Italian women's national under-16 and under-17 basketball team is a national basketball team of Italy and is governed by the Federazione Italiana Pallacanestro. 
It represents the country in international under-16 and under-17 (under age 16 and under age 17) women's basketball competitions.

They won the title at the 2018 FIBA U16 Women's European Championship.

FIBA Under-17 Women's World Cup results

See also
Italy women's national basketball team
Italy women's national under-19 basketball team

References

U
Women's national under-17 basketball teams